Homestead Valley, California may refer to:
 Homestead Valley, Marin County, California, an unincorporated community
 Homestead Valley, San Bernardino County, California, a census-designated place